Hawkhurst railway station was on the closed Hawkhurst Branch in Kent, England.

Background
It had a single  situated on the down side, and a short . The station was built as a through station, as it was proposed to extend the line to Tenterden but the extension was never built. The stationmaster's house is located to the south of the station as approached from the road. There was a two-road locomotive shed which opened at the same time as the station; it officially closed in 1931. The railway was used to send pot plants from Hawkhurst station; a million a year being reported.

The station was closed with the line on 12 June 1961. The site is now occupied by the Kent Woodware Company. The main station building was demolished in the mid-1960s. The engine shed, goods shed and signal box all survive in decent condition. The proprietor of the site has the signal box regularly repainted in Southern Railway colours and it retains its green and white "Hawkhurst" sign.

However, as of 14 January 2011, plans have been approved to build industrial units on the site.

Notes

References

External links
 Hawkhurst railway station at Disused-Stations.org.uk
 Hawkhurst station on navigable 1940 O. S. map
Signal diagram, 1893

Disused railway stations in Kent
Hawkhurst
Former South Eastern Railway (UK) stations
Railway stations in Great Britain opened in 1893
Railway stations in Great Britain closed in 1961